Amy Mizzi (born 21 July 1983) is an Australian actress. She starred as Kit Hunter in the Australian soap opera Home and Away in 2003 and early 2004. Mizzi's departure from Home and Away was announced on 13 February 2004 but she continued to appear on a recurring basis throughout 2004 and returned in August 2005. She also made appearances in 2006, most recently in the last episode of Home and Away for 2006, when she returned pregnant with the baby of Kim Hyde (played by actor Chris Hemsworth). She was nominated for Most Popular New Female Talent in the Logie Awards of 2004, but the award was won by her Home and Away co-star Isabel Lucas.

After leaving Home and Away she taught singing and dancing on the Central Coast of New South Wales. In 2008, she moved to the United Kingdom permanently, and has since appeared in several pantomimes, playing the title role in Cinderella and in Rotherham's Aladdin as Princess Jasmine.

Filmography
 Home and Away (2003–2007)

References

External links
 
 Amy Mizzi feature interview, Home and Away, Network Seven

1983 births
Living people
Australian soap opera actresses
Australian expatriates in the United Kingdom